The Academy of Saint Elizabeth is a private college preparatory secondary school for young women located in Convent Station, New Jersey, United States. Established in 1860, the academy is the oldest secondary school for women in New Jersey. The school is within the Roman Catholic Diocese of Paterson, but operates on an independent basis. The school has been accredited by the Middle States Association of Colleges and Schools Commissions on Elementary and Secondary Schools since 1928 and is accredited until January 2027.

As of the 2019–20 school year, the school had an enrollment of 192 students and 21.1 classroom teachers (on an FTE basis), for a student–teacher ratio of 9.1:1. The school's student body was 85.9% (165) White, 6.3% (12) two or more races, 4.2% (8) Hispanic, 2.1% (4) Asian and 1.6% (3) Black.

The community of Convent Station, which is adjacent to Morristown, was named for the railway station constructed in the 1870s to accommodate the  complex of the Sisters of Charity of Saint Elizabeth that also includes Saint Elizabeth University and Saint Anne's Villa. The religious order was founded in 1859 in Newark, but in 1860 the motherhouse of the new religious order and the academy were established on the site.

The academy is a member of the New Jersey Association of Independent Schools.

History
The Academy of Saint Elizabeth was founded at Morristown in 1860 by the Sisters of Charity. In 1859, Mother Xavier was commissioned by Bishop James Roosevelt Bayley to establish a school for young women in New Jersey, the first secondary school for young women in the state. The academy was established in Madison in September 1860 in a white frame building that still stands. The renaming of Convent Station would come later when Mother Xavier provided funding in the 1870s for the Convent Station train station just outside the front gate of the school campus.

When the religious order founded the academy, they moved their motherhouse and convent from Newark onto a parcel that was located on the developing "Millionaires Row" that stretched from Lonataka Parkway to the center of Morristown, described as the "inland Newport" because of the numerous wealthy families who built grand homes along the route. In 1865, Morristown changed its incorporation to the new "town" category with a boundary that then excluded their large land holdings. Thirty years later, that boundary line officially delineated two governmental jurisdictions in 1895 when Morristown was formally set off from the rest of Morris Township.

The College of Saint Elizabeth (renamed in 2020 to Saint Elizabeth University) was founded in 1899 as part of the complex and, notably, it is the oldest women's college in New Jersey and one of the first Catholic colleges in the United States to award degrees to women. After the new boundary delineated the governmental jurisdiction of Morristown as a smaller area, a community eventually grew up between Morristown and Madison as a separate entity that eventually took its name from the railway station built on the extensive Saint Elizabeth's property.

The first students entered in 1860; the Registration Ledger of September 1 still resides in the principal's office, as do the records of every succeeding year. In 1865, the new academy building was completed, and its first commencement exercises were held on the growing campus. By then, the school had gained a wide reputation for scholarship and was recognized and accepted throughout the state as an institution of strong academics, culture, and Catholic learning for young women.

Initially, the academy served as a boarding school with students from many countries, but in the 1970s it became strictly a day school. The dormitories were converted into classrooms.

Campus
Covent Station is an approximately three-minute walk from the academy and many of the students make use of NJ transit to commute to and from school.

The Shakespeare Garden is located in front of the school. St. Elizabeth's recently held a contest to name the garden located in the rear of the school and decided on the title, "Sea of Flowers."

The Sisters of Charity live adjacent to the school and frequently participate in activities with the students. The Holy Family chapel is also found next to the academy, and the students often take part in mass on different occasions.

Academy life

School schedule

Sample 'D day'

Homeroom 8:10-8:15

Period 1 8:19-9:15

Period 2 9:17 - 10:13

Period 3 10:15 - 11:11

Lunch 11:13 - 11:58

Period 5 12:00 - 12:56

Period 6 12:58 - 1:54

Period 7 1:56 - 2:51

The academy runs on a 4-day rotating schedule (A day, B day, C day, and D day). Each day, students drop a morning and afternoon class.

Calendar

You can find the 2018–2019 school year calendar on the Academy of Saint Elizabeth website posted in the External Links section below. The calendar will provide you with what is happening during the school year.

Daily life

The school day starts off with homeroom. During homeroom, the students have time to finish homework, talk with friends and teachers, or eat. The academy offers breakfast every morning. Students wear a uniform every day, [a sweater, polo shirt, skirt, socks, and shoes]. After morning prayer and announcements, the young women attend morning classes. There is a four-day rotating schedule in which the students have four morning classes but attend three each day.

After the morning classes, the students and staff come together again for lunch. There are new meals each day, plus everyday access to a salad bar, cookies, fruits, vegetables, and a wide selection of drinks. During the 45-minute luncheon break, students also have the option to meet with clubs. The academy offers more than 25 clubs for students. After lunch, students attend three of their four afternoon classes according to the rotating schedule. The school day ends with afternoon prayers.

Traditions

At the academy, there are many different traditions that are important to the school. One tradition is Spirit Week. During Spirit Week, students show spirit toward their school by participating in different activities. Another tradition is the Mother-daughter tea. Mothers come with their daughters and all have tea, bond together, and socialize with others. The Alma Mater competition is a competition between all four grades to make videos, skits, or songs to show their love toward the academy and to sing the Alma Mater along with it. The Calendar Party is a tradition where each grade gets a certain season assigned to them and the students create a party to represent something that happens in that season. The academy also has an annual spring trip abroad to all different places. The final annual tradition, the Senior Fashion Show, takes place around the end of the year.

Seasterhood

Seasters is what the students have come to call each other at the academy. Seasterhood is the term used to represent Sisterhood at The Academy of Saint Elizabeth and students at the academy call their peers seasters to represent that as well as being classmates, they consider themselves as a family.

Transportation

Students who attend the academy come from many different municipalities. Some of the students take the train to school. The NJ Transit stop, Convent Station, is at the front gate to the academy. The academy provides bus transportation for students who live in Florham Park, Whippany, Hanover, and East Hanover.

Athletics
The Academy of Saint Elizabeth Panthers compete in the Northwest Jersey Athletic Conference (NJAC), New Jersey Independent Schools Athletic Association (NJISAA), and North Jersey Interscholastic Girls Lacrosse League (NJIGLL). More than 75% of students at the academy partake in at least one interscholastic sport.

The academy offers a range of sports including soccer, volleyball, field hockey, tennis, equestrian sports, basketball, swimming, lacrosse, softball, and track and field.

The school participates as the host school / lead agency for a joint cooperative field hockey team with Morris Catholic High School, while Morris Catholic is the host school for joint cross country running and ice hockey teams. All of these co-op programs operate under agreements scheduled to expire at the end of the 2023–24 school year.

The swimming team won the state Non-Public B state championship in 1999 and 2005. The 1999 team was awarded the Non-Public B title by the NJSIAA. In 2005, the team won the Non-Public B title with a 107–63 win in the finals against Bishop Eustace. The swim team won six straight Northern Hills Conference Championships (2002–2007) and came in second in the 2007 Morris County Championships.

The academy's basketball team faced Stuart Country Day School in the Prep B tournament finals in the 2017–2018 season.

The tennis team won a division title in the NJAC Independent Division in 2014.

The academy has an equestrian team, which practices through the fall and winter seasons. The team practices and competes at Lord Stirling Stables in Basking Ridge.

Academics and curriculum
The academy requires four years each of mathematics, English, and religious studies. Other requirements are three years each of physical education and social studies. The social studies requirements are one year of world history and two years of U.S. history. The academy also requires three years of sciences; options include biology, chemistry, and physics. It also requires at least two years of the same foreign language, which include French, Latin, and Spanish, but three total years of a foreign language. At least one full year of art class is required, as well as five semesters of fitness/wellness and a full year of technology.

Juniors, seniors, and sophomores may take college preparatory, honors, or advanced placement courses, while freshmen are limited to college preparatory and honors courses. College courses include those entitled, Children of Abraham, Bioethics, New Testament Honors, Modern European History: The Western Response, and The Reading Life: Identity in the Graphic Novel. The academy offers 11 advanced placement courses options include: Calculus AB and BC, AP Latin, AP French, Spanish Literature, Literature and Composition, Language and Composition, U.S. History, European History, Chemistry, and Biology.

Scholarships

Catherine C. Murphy Memorial Scholarship - This scholarship is granted annually to an incoming freshman who expresses a need for financial aid.

Eileen M. O’Rourke Student Activities Scholarship Fund - This scholarship is granted to an incoming freshman who expresses a need for financial aid and partakes in community service.
  
Alumni Legacy Scholarship - This scholarship is awarded to any freshman who has relation to an alumna of the academy. The applicant must fulfill the normal application process and submit an essay explaining why being a legacy of the academy is important to her.

The Class of 1967 Scholarship - This scholarship is awarded to any academy junior who demonstrates academic excellence, completes the proper application form, and submits an essay by the deadline.

Mother Xavier Merit Scholarship- This scholarship is awarded to ninth grade students who achieved academic excellence in middle school and have moral ethics that agrees with the academy's mission.

Clubs and extracurriculars
The clubs that are offered to students at the academy include: Ambassadors, Baking Club, Book Club, Bridges Outreach, Business and Entrepreneurship Club, Drama Club, Ecology Club, EPOCH (Educational Programs of Children Handicapped), Fashion Club, Film Club, Forensics, French Club, Health Care Club, Junior States of America, Latin Club, National Honor Society, Panther Banter (the online school newspaper), Prom Committee, Ski and Snowboard Club, Spanish Club, Student Council, Yearbook, Toward Boundless Charity, and Women's Empowerment Club. Academy students performs a spring musical each year as well.

The academy offers an annual trip to a different destination during spring break. Past trips include Australia and New Zealand (2018), Hawaii (2017), and Italy and France (2016).
Each spring, the academy hosts an art show to display the work of students who have taken art classes throughout the year.

The academy offers academic summer programs for both incoming freshmen and current students, including Foundations of English and Mathematics, SAT Preparation classes, and art classes such as drawing, painting, and introduction to ceramics. The academy also offers a co-ed Forensic Science summer camp for grades 6–8.

Notable alumni
 Ann McLaughlin Korologos (1941– 2023),  corporate executive who served as the 19th United States secretary of labor, from 1987 to 1989.
 Anne Ryan (1889–1954), abstract expressionist artist associated with the New York School.

References

External links 
Academy of Saint Elizabeth School Website
Data for the Academy of St. Elizabeth, National Center for Education Statistics

1860 establishments in New Jersey
Educational institutions established in 1860
Girls' schools in New Jersey
Middle States Commission on Secondary Schools
New Jersey Association of Independent Schools
Private high schools in Morris County, New Jersey
Roman Catholic Diocese of Paterson
Catholic secondary schools in New Jersey